Kar Chiska (also Romanized as Kar Chīskā; also known as Gohrej-e Bālā and Kal Chīskā) is a village in Saghder Rural District, Jebalbarez District, Jiroft County, Kerman Province, Iran. At the 2006 census, its population was 106, in 21 families.

References 

Populated places in Jiroft County